Polyglyptini is a tribe of treehoppers in the family Membracidae. There are at least four genera and about nine described species in Polyglyptini.

Genera
These four genera belong to the tribe Polyglyptini:
 Bryantopsis Ball, 1937 c g b
 Entylia Germar, 1833 c g b
 Polyglypta Burmeister, 1835 c g b
 Publilia Stål, 1866 c g b
Data sources: i = ITIS, c = Catalogue of Life, g = GBIF, b = Bugguide.net

References

Further reading

External links

 

Hemiptera tribes
Smiliinae